Ivan Eisler OBE is a British psychologist and Professor in the Institute of Psychiatry at King's College London. Eisler is a fellow of the Academy of Social Sciences, and was a recipient of 2016 Birthday Honours for his services to family therapy.

References

External links

Living people
Date of birth missing (living people)
Family therapists
British psychotherapists
Academics of King's College London
Alumni of New College, Oxford
Alumni of King's College London
Fellows of the Academy of Social Sciences
Year of birth missing (living people)
Officers of the Order of the British Empire